Los Cerrillos Airport was the main aviation facility of Santiago, Chile until 1967, when Arturo Merino Benitez International Airport was opened.

The airport was closed in 2006.

See also

Transport in Chile
List of airports in Chile

References

Defunct airports
Airports in Chile
Transport in Santiago
Airports in Santiago Metropolitan Region
Airports disestablished in 2006